Claire Simpson is a British film editor whose work has been honored with an Academy Award (for Oliver Stone's Platoon) and a BAFTA Film Award for Best Editing for The Constant Gardener. She was mentored by Dede Allen and in turn mentored such notable and renowned Academy Award-winning film editors as Pietro Scalia, David Brenner, Joe Hutshing and Julie Monroe. She also worked as editor of Oliver Stone's Salvador and Wall Street.

See: Academy Award for Best Film Editing

Claire Simpson - Quotes about editing

"I think that editing has...to do with architecture and, having built a house recently, I can honestly say that dealing with the plumbing can be as tantalizing as disguising the mechanics of the plot."
"Cutting rooms are only dark and gloomy places if you make them so. Hard work, educated taste, sharp instincts and a flair for the absurd have been essential to my career as an editor as well as important ingredients for my life. And never underestimate the value of good luck. I know many extraordinarily talented people who have not been lucky enough to win an Academy Award. Don't get me wrong, it was remarkably validating to win. But what really counts is to face every working day with the guts to be honest both with your director and with the material you're working with. If you can't do that, don't take the job."

Filmography

As film editor 

 Peace on Borrowed Time (1983) (TV)
 C.H.U.D. (1984)
 Salvador (1986)
 Platoon (1986)
 Someone to Watch Over Me (1987)
 Wall Street (1987)
 Tequila Sunrise (1988)
 Hell High (1989)
 State of Grace (1990)
 The Mambo Kings (1992)
 Black Beauty (1994)
 The Fan (1996)
 Without Limits (1998)
 Jakob the Liar (1999)
 Town & Country (2001)
 Possession (2002)
 The Constant Gardener (2005)
 The Return (2006)
 Stop-Loss (2008)
 The Reader (2008)
 Nine (2009)
 Extremely Loud & Incredibly Close (2011)
 A Most Wanted Man (2014)
 Far from the Madding Crowd (2015)
 The Snowman (2017)
 All the Money in the World (2017)
 The Last Duel (2021)
 House of Gucci (2021)

As assistant film editor 

 Caligula (1979) (uncredited)
 Reds (1981)

Additional editing 

 Black Mass (2015)

Thanks 

 Imagining Argentina (2003)
 The Tree of Life (2011)

Academy Award nominations & wins
2006 – The Constant Gardener (nominated) Best Film Editing
1987 – Platoon (won) Best Film Editing

Other awards and nominations
2006 – The Constant Gardener (nominated) ACE Eddie - Best Edited Feature Film, Dramatic
2006 – The Constant Gardener (won) BAFTA FIlm Award - Best Editing
2006 – The Constant Gardener (nominated) OFCS Award (Online Film Critics Society) Best Editing
1987 – Platoon (won) ACE Eddie - Best Edited Feature Film
1988 – Platoon (won) BAFTA FIlm Award - Best Editing

References

External links
 
 Avid: The Constant Gardener: Cultivating a Sophisticated Drama

Best Editing BAFTA Award winners
Best Film Editing Academy Award winners
British film editors
Living people
Year of birth missing (living people)
British women film editors